Naval Ordnance Station Forest Park (NOSF) was in Forest Park, Illinois. It was founded during World War II (1942-1945) as Naval Ordnance Plant Forest Park (NOPF). The Forest Park Station was instrumental in building torpedoes for the Navy, employing up to 6,500 workers and producing 19,000 torpedoes. Torpedo production was halted in 1945 and research and development was performed until the main plant was shuttered and converted into a mall in 1971. The remaining facilities were turned into a Naval Reserve Center until it was finally closed in April 2007.

References

Weapons and ammunition installations of the United States Navy
Military installations in Illinois
Military installations established in 1942
Buildings and structures in Cook County, Illinois
Forest Park, Illinois
Military installations closed in 1971
1942 establishments in Illinois
1971 disestablishments in Illinois

Closed installations of the United States Navy